= Judo at the 2010 South American Games – Men's nage-no-kata =

Judo competition

The Men's Nague No Kata event at the 2010 South American Games was held at 8:00 on March 19.

== Medalists ==
Gold	Silver	Bronze
Glatenferd Escobar; Luis Gabriel Cuartas; Colombia	Rioiti Uchida; Luis Santos; Brazil	Medardo Duarte; Javier Rivero; Venezuela; Johnny Martin Ramirez; Luis Jaime Romero; Peru

== Results ==
Rank	Athletes	Result
1st place, gold medalist(s)	Colombia; Glatenferd Escobar; Luis Gabriel Cuartas	141
2nd place, silver medalist(s)	Brazil; Rioiti Uchida; Luis Santos	136
3rd place, bronze medalist(s)	Venezuela; Medardo Duarte; Javier Rivero	128
3rd place, bronze medalist(s)	Peru; Johnny Martin Ramirez; Luis Jaime Romero	116
5	Argentina; Ervin Cirigliano; Matias Garcia	115
6	Paraguay; Abraham de Jesus Mora; Sergio Daniel Casamada	95
